Spur des Falken is an East German film. It was released in 1968.

The film was followed by a sequel, Weiße Wölfe (1969).

Cast
 Gojko Mitić: Weitspähender Falke
 Hannjo Hasse: Joe Bludgeon
 Barbara Brylska: Catherine Emerson
 Lali Meszchi: Blauhaar
 Rolf Hoppe: James Bashan
 Hartmut Beer: Fletcher
 Helmut Schreiber: Samuel Blake
 Fred Delmare: Peter Hille
 Milan Jablonsky: Bad Face
 Holger Mahlich: Pat
 Fred Ludwig: Emmerson
 Horst Kube: Chat

External links
 

1968 films
1968 Western (genre) films
German Western (genre) films
East German films
1960s German-language films
Ostern films
Films directed by Gottfried Kolditz
1960s German films